Sheepwash Channel Railway Bridge is a railway bridge over Sheepwash Channel in west Oxford, England, just north of Oxford railway station. To the north are Cripley Meadow and Fiddler's Island. To the south are Osney Island and the Botley Road.

The bridge is close to Rewley Road Swing Bridge just to the east, an older and now disused swing bridge for the former Buckinghamshire Railway line of London and North Western Railway that used to serve the Oxford Rewley Road railway station. It is also close to Rewley Road Bridge to the east. Sheepwash channel links the River Thames with the Oxford Canal via Castle Mill Stream and Isis Lock.

Gallery

References

Bridges in Oxford
Railway bridges in Oxfordshire
Girder bridges